"In Too Deep" is a song by Canadian rock band Sum 41. It is the seventh track on their debut studio album All Killer No Filler (2001), and was released as the second single in September 2001.

History
According to Ben Cook of Fucked Up, No Warning and Young Guv, "In Too Deep" was originally a reggae song, to be released by writer Greig Nori's band Treble Charger and feature rapper Snow in the verses.

Singer Deryck Whibley told Kerrang that one night when he was 18, he and his friend, guitarist Dave Baksh, were going to drive to downtown Toronto to hang out. Baksh was very late in picking Whibley up, and Whibley started playing around with his guitar while sitting by the window and waiting. The riff came first, and he started improvising verses and the chorus, and within three or four minutes, had come up with everything but the guitar solo and bridge. He recorded it on his small recorder before Baksh finally arrived, and didn't think much of it. He finally got around to finishing the whole song a few months later.

He said "the words were based on very basic-level relationship stuff that I’d gone through in high school, because that was my reference point." Specifically, the inspiration was a bad relationship he'd had in 10th grade, which at the time had made him never want to have another girlfriend again. "I guess I was able to sort of tap into those early relationships and it’s universal, so I was milling the simplicity in that. There’s something magical about that era in your life," he said.

Music video
The music video was directed by Marc Klasfeld and premiered in September 2001. It is a parody of the diving competition scene from the Rodney Dangerfield film Back to School. Sum 41 face another dive team, represented as stereotypical high school "jocks" with muscular bodies and red Speedos. Each band member takes their turn diving off the board in comical fashion as they dive against their opposition, who dive with mocking perfection. After guitarist Dave Baksh completes his dive, he then rises out of the water to play his guitar solo (Baksh and bassist Jason "Cone" McCaslin have both confirmed this scene was inspired by the video for Guns N' Roses' "Estranged"). After each dive, the video cuts to a scene of the band playing in an empty pool surrounded by fans. For the last dive, drummer Steve Jocz does a comically dramatic dive similar to the dive done by Dangerfield's character in Back to School (known as the 'Triple Lindy' in the film) in which he bounces off of every diving board and lands perfectly in the water. Jocz is rewarded with near-perfect marks from the judges, the band wins the competition and the judges and some of the audience jump into the pool in celebration.

The diving scenes were filmed at the since-demolished Industry Hills Aquatic Club in the City of Industry, California. The pool scenes were shot at the Cadillac Jack's and Pink Motel in Sun Valley, California.

Track listings
Single
 In Too Deep (3:27)
 Fat Lip (Live) (2:55)
 All She's Got (Live) (3:02)
 It's What We're All About (Live, With Tommy Lee on drums) (2:47)
 Liam's awful rendition (3:23)

Radio promo CD
 In Too Deep (3:27)
 Fat Lip (2:58)

Charts and certifications

Weekly charts

Year-end charts

Certifications

Release history

References

External links
 

2001 singles
2001 songs
Island Records singles
Mercury Records singles
Music videos directed by Marc Klasfeld
Songs written by Deryck Whibley
Songs written by Greig Nori
Sum 41 songs